Tanya Bonakdar Gallery is an art gallery founded by Tanya Bonakdar, located in both Chelsea in New York City and Los Angeles. Since its inception in 1994, the gallery has exhibited new work by contemporary artists in all media, including painting, sculpture, installation, photography, and video.
The New York City location is at 521 W. 21st Street and the Los Angeles gallery is located at 1010 N. Highland Avenue.

History
The gallery was originally located in the SoHo area, but moved to Chelsea in 1998 following other galleries' moves. and in 2006 underwent a major renovation that doubled the exhibition space, adding  of gallery space on the ground floor. In addition, Tanya Bonakdar Gallery regularly participates in major annual international art fairs such as Art Basel, Frieze Art Fair, Art Basel Miami Beach, The Armory Show (art fair) and Art Dealers Association of America Art Show.

In 2018, Bonakdar announced plans to launch her first space in Los Angeles, located at 1010 North Highland Avenue in Hollywood.

Tanya Bonakdar is a member of the Board of Directors of the Art Dealers Association of America (ADAA).

Artists

The gallery represents over 30  artists, including

 Kelly Akashi 
 Uta Barth 
 Monica Bonvicini (since 2022)
 Martin Boyce
 Sandra Cinto
 Phil Collins
 Mat Collishaw
 Mark Dion
 Nathalie Djurberg & Hans Berg
 Olafur Eliasson 
 Meschac Gaba (since 2013)
 Shilpa Gupta
 Sabine Hornig
 Teresa Hubbard / Alexander Birchler
 Jónsi
 Carla Klein
 Laura Lima
 Liu Shiyuan
 Charles Long 
 Rita Lundqvist
 Mark Manders
 Ernesto Neto 
 Rivane Neuenschwander
 Lisa Oppenheim
 Karyn Olivier
 Lisa Oppenheim
 Susan Philipsz
 Amalia Pica
 Dana Powell
 Peggy Preheim
 Sherrill Roland
 Analia Saban
 Tomás Saraceno
 Thomas Scheibitz
 Slavs and Tatars
 Hannah Starkey
 Haim Steinbach
 Dirk Stewen
 Sarah Sze
 Jeffrey Vallance
 Gillian Wearing
 Nicole Wermers
 Lisa Williamson
 Wong Ping

References

External links
 Tanya Bonakdar Gallery website

Contemporary art galleries in the United States
Art museums and galleries in Manhattan
Art museums and galleries in Los Angeles
Art galleries established in 1994
1994 establishments in New York City
Chelsea, Manhattan